The Kinzig is a river, 87 kilometres long, in southern Hesse, Germany. It is a right tributary of the Main. Its source is in the Spessart hills at Sterbfritz, near Schlüchtern. The Kinzig flows into the Main in Hanau. The Main-Kinzig-Kreis (district) was named after the river. The towns along the Kinzig are Schlüchtern, Steinau an der Straße, Bad Soden-Salmünster, Gelnhausen, and Hanau. The Kinzig is first recorded in 815 A.D. as Chinzicha.

This river played a part in the Battle of Hanau in October 1813, as Napoleon retreated back to the Rhine, after his defeat at the Battle of Leipzig.

There are several German rivers called Kinzig. Another Kinzig flows into the Rhine in Kehl-Auenheim

Geography

Sources 

It is a small spring, enclosed in sandstone, that has an outflow pipe. The headstream that rises here flows for a few metres towards the northwest where it unites with a longer headstream.

Course 

From its source, the Kinzig runs northwest and forms the boundary between the Hessian Rhön Nature Park and the Hessian Spessart Nature Park as far as Schlüchtern. West of Schlüchtern the Kinzig flows in a southwesterly direction and separates the Vogelsberg hills to the north from the Spessart to the south. Between Steinau and Ahl is the Kinzig Dam. In its lower reaches the Kinzig is used by canoeists.
Shortly before Hanau the Kinzig flows through the so-called Bulau. This woodland area was formerly used by the US Army as an exercise area and is therefore still very natural. During high water, water flows rapidly through many ditches in the water meadows so that, in spring, extensive bear garlic meadows appear. Here, there are balcony-like views of the castle of Philippsruhe or the Main river port. The observation platform comprises two interleaved terraces linked by a steel wall.

Places on the Kinzig 
(in downstream order)
 Sterbfritz (source)
 Sannerz
 Vollmerz
 Herolz
 Schlüchtern
 Niederzell
 Steinau an der Straße
 Ahl
 Salmünster
 Neudorf
 Wächtersbach
 Wirtheim
 Haitz
 Gelnhausen
 Lieblos
 Rothenbergen
 Langenselbold
 Erlensee
 Niederrodenbach
 Hanau (mouth on the Main)

Tributaries 
The Kinzig catchment covers an area of 1,058 square kilometres.

The most important tributaries (>10 km) are (in downstream order)
 the Steinebach, Ulmbach, Salz, Bracht, Orb, Bieber, Birkigsbach, Gründau, Lache and Fallbach.

References

External links 

 Kinzig catchment area (pdf 1.62 MB)
 HLUG-Pegel Hanau
 
 
 The Kinzig is barrier free: fish may swim unhindered. FR, 7 August 2009, Alexander Polaschek

Rivers of Hesse
 
Main-Kinzig-Kreis
Vogelsberg
Rivers of the Spessart
Rivers of the Vogelsberg
Rivers of Germany